Although juggling in its western form involving props such as balls, rings, and clubs is rarely performed in modern China, at certain periods in Chinese history it was much more popular. In fact, some of the world's earliest known jugglers were Chinese warriors and entertainers who lived during the time of the Spring and Autumn period of Chinese history. References to these artists in ancient Chinese literature have preserved records of their incredible achievements. From such references, it appears that juggling was a well-regarded and highly developed form of ancient Chinese art.

Xiong Yiliao 
Xiong Yiliao, was a famous Chu warrior who fought under King Zhuang of Chu (ruled 613-591 BC) during the Spring and Autumn period of Chinese history. Ancient Chinese annals state that he practiced nongwan ("throwing multiple objects up and down without dropping"), and he is often cited as one of the world's earliest known jugglers. During a battle in about 603 BC between the states of Chu  and Song, Xiong Yiliao stepped out between the armies and juggled nine balls, captivating the Song troops. The Chu army took this opportunity to launch a surprise attack and routed the Song army.  As Xu Wugui recounts in Chapter 24 of the Zhuangzi , “Yiliao of Shinan juggled balls, and the conflict between the two states was ended.”

Lanzi 
Lanzi, another juggler from the Spring and Autumn period who is mentioned in the Chinese annals, lived during the reign of Duke Yuan of Song (531-517 BC). Roughly translated, Chapter 8 of the Liezi, an ancient collection of Daoist sayings, reads as follows:

The passage states that Lanzi juggled the jian, a straight, double-edged sword which was used during the Spring and Autumn period.  According to Jian Zhao in The Early Warrior and the Birth of the Xia, Lanzi was a general term for itinerant entertainers in pre-Qin and Han times.

Chinese yo-yo

Diabolos evolved from the ancient Chinese yo-yo, which was originally standardized in the 12th century.

See also
:zh:熊宜僚 Chinese Wikipedia: 熊宜bob

References 

Juggling
History of ancient China
History of games